Mont Colombier (2,043 m) is a mountain of the Bauges Massif in the French Prealps in Savoie, France.

References

Mountains of Savoie
Mountains of the Alps
Two-thousanders of France